Project 10510, also known through the Russian type size series designations LK-110Ya and LK-120Ya or the project name Leader, is a planned series of Russian nuclear-powered icebreakers. Designed in the 2010s, when built in the 2020s, it would supersede Project 22220 icebreakers as the largest and most powerful icebreakers in the world.

, the lead vessel of the series is under construction and expected to be commissioned by 2027. In total, it had been planned to build three vessels by 2033. They were planned to be operated by the Russian company FSUE Atomflot which operates Russia's fleet of nuclear-powered icebreakers. However, in February 2023 it was reported that  only one Project 10510 vessel would be built before 2035.

Background and development 
In the late 1980s, Central Marine Research and Design Institute (CNIIMF) and the Central Design Bureau "Iceberg" developed a number of "icebreaker type size series" for a long-term fleet renewal program initiated shortly after the dissolution of the Soviet Union. In addition to smaller diesel-electric icebreakers, the proposed icebreaking vessels included two distinct nuclear-powered icebreaker designs: a 60-megawatt dual-draft line icebreaker and a 110-megawatt "leader-icebreaker". The latter's primary mission would be to ensure reliable year-round shipping in the Russian Arctic, including transit cargo along the Northern Sea Route as well as transportation of raw materials and natural resources produced from the continental shelf.

In the late 2000s, increasing shipping activity in the Russian Arctic and the prospect of turning the Northern Sea Route into a year-round shortcut between Western Europe and Asia called for the development of more powerful icebreakers. The 110-megawatt icebreaker, now referred to simply as "Leader" (or "Lider" as romanized from the Russian word Лидер), was seen as the key for ensuring that large container ships could transit the northern passage in just ten days.

In September 2011, then Prime Minister Vladimir Putin mentioned the construction of 110-megawatt nuclear-powered icebreakers "here in the northwestern shipyards in Russia" in his speech at the interregional conference of United Russia in Cherepovets. Shortly afterwards, Krylov State Research Center began developing the vessel concept in co-operation with Central Design Bureau "Iceberg".

While the Saint Petersburg-based Baltic Shipyard, builder of the preceding Arktika class and the Project 22220 icebreakers, declared itself as the only Russian shipyard with the necessary competence to construct nuclear-powered icebreakers, the newly-constructed shipbuilding complex "Zvezda" in Bolshoy Kamen in the Russian Far East was also seen as a serious contender. However, proposals to built the vessel at Zaliv Shipbuilding Yard in Kerch in the Russian-annexed Crimea were largely dismissed. In September 2018, Zvezda was officially selected as the sole builder of the Project 10510 icebreakers. In February 2019, CEO of Zvezda, Sergei Tseluyko, confirmed during an interview with TASS that the plan is to build three Project 10510 icebreakers at the shipyard.

On 15 January 2020, shortly before resigning, then Prime Minister Dmitry Medvedev signed a governmental order allocating 125.57 billion rubles of federal money for financing the construction of the first Project 10510 icebreaker for Rosatom from 2020 onwards and commissioning it by 2027. Previously, the funding for the construction of the icebreaker had been excluded from the 2017–2025 state program for the development of the Arctic as funding had been cut from 209.7 billion to 50.9 billion rubles.

On 23 April 2020, Atomflot and Zvezda signed the shipbuilding contract for the construction of the first Project 10510 icebreaker.

In February 2023 it was reported that an update of Russia's arctic strategy provided for only one Project 10510 vessel to be built before 2035. The emphasis will instead shift to two additional icebreakers of the Project 22220-class.

Construction 

The steel cutting for the first Project 10510 icebreaker began at Zvezda on 6 July 2020. The first vessel of the series will be named Rossiya, a name previously given to the third Arktika-class icebreaker that was in service in 1985–2013. It was laid down on 5 July 2021. The construction of two follow-on vessels is planned to begin in 2023 and 2025 respectively. The envisaged dates for making those ships operational are 2030 and 2032.

Design

General characteristics 

In 2015, students from the Saint Petersburg Art and Industry Academy collaborated with Central Design Bureau "Iceberg" to develop futuristic visions on what the next-generation nuclear-powered icebreaker could look like. While these sleek yacht-like design studies have been sometimes incorrectly thought to represent the actual Project 10510 icebreaker design, the actual design is a departure from the more angular previous nuclear icebreakers.

Power and propulsion 
The icebreakers are powered by two RITM-400 nuclear reactors with a thermal output of 315 megawatts each. Four electrically-driven shafts with a combined capacity of  allow the vessel to break up to  ice.

Ships in class

Notes

References 

Icebreakers of Russia
Proposed ships
Nuclear-powered icebreakers